The Masonic Temple in Washington, District of Columbia is a building from 1903. It was listed on the National Register of Historic Places in 1987, and is also on the D.C. Inventory List of Historic Sites. The building currently houses the National Museum of Women in the Arts.

History
The  Masonic temple is a Renaissance Revival style building. The building was the headquarters of the Grand Lodge of the District of Columbia.  It replaced an older building constructed in 1870 at 9th and F streets (which as of 2013 is still standing).  Initially drafted by architect Waddy B. Wood, the main building was completed in 1908 in an effort to bring the City Beautiful movement to Washington, D.C. Notably, Wood was recognized as being especially supportive of women architects during his lifetime. The lot that was known as "Seven Oaks" was bought for $115,000 in 1899. As the building was originally designed, the upper floors were reserved for Masonic rites, the middle floors were office space, and an auditorium on the first floor was meant to be rented out as a source of income. From 1941 until 1983, the auditorium was used as a public movie theater.

In 1983 the building was put up for sale by the Freemasons and was purchased that year by the National Museum of Women in the Arts.  The interior of the building was renovated, with the auditorium converted into a special events space.  The museum opened in 1987.

References

Masonic buildings in Washington, D.C.
Masonic buildings completed in 1903
Clubhouses on the National Register of Historic Places in Washington, D.C.
Neoclassical architecture in Washington, D.C.